Brachygnathus is a genus of ground beetles in the family Carabidae, the sole genus of the tribe Brachygnathini.

Species
These seven species belong to the genus Brachygnathus:
 Brachygnathus angusticollis (Burmeister, 1885)  (Argentina, Brazil, and Paraguay)
 Brachygnathus fervidus (Burmeister, 1885)  (Argentina)
 Brachygnathus festivus (Dejean, 1830)  (Argentina, Brazil, and Paraguay)
 Brachygnathus imperialis (Chaudoir, 1863)  (Brazil, Chile, and Paraguay)
 Brachygnathus intermedius Perty, 1830  (Brazil)
 Brachygnathus muticus Perty, 1830  (Argentina, Brazil, and Paraguay)
 Brachygnathus oxygonus Perty, 1830  (Brazil, Chile, and Paraguay)

References

External links

 

Panagaeinae